The Grajaú class is a class of patrol boats of the Brazilian Navy. Grajaú was the first of twelve Grajaú-class patrol boats ordered by the Brazilian Navy in September 1990. Grajaú was launched on 21 May 1993, and was commissioned on 1 December 1993.

History
In June 2009, NPa Grajaú participated in the recovery mission of the wreckage of Air France Flight 447.

Ships

References

Ships built in Brazil
Patrol vessels of the Brazilian Navy
Patrol boat classes